HMCS Athabaskan was the first of three destroyers of the Royal Canadian Navy to bear this name. She was named for the First Nations peoples who make up the Athabaskan language group. She was torpedoed in the English Channel and sunk in 1944.

Athabaskan was ordered 5 April 1940 as part of the 1940-1941 building programme. She was laid down  in the United Kingdom on 31 October 1940 by Vickers Armstrong of Newcastle upon Tyne and constructed in consort with Parsons engine works. She was launched on 18 November 1941 and commissioned into the Royal Canadian Navy on 3 February 1943.

Service history
HMCS Athabaskan had a relatively short service of about 14 months between her commissioning and sinking. The ship also experienced several major mishaps and battle damage that required her being taken out of service for repairs for a total of about five months. When these repair periods are taken into account, Athabaskan was available for actual service at sea for a total of only nine months prior to her sinking.

After a short work-up subsequent to commissioning on 3 February 1943, Athabaskan sailed on 29 March 1943 to patrol the Iceland-Faeroes Passage for blockade runners, but heavy seas damaged her hull, which took five weeks to repair at South Shields. Shortly after returning to service, in early June 1943 she took part in Operation Gearbox III, the relief of the garrison at Spitsbergen.

On 18 June 1943, Athabaskan sustained damage during a collision with the boom defence vessel Bargate at Scapa Flow, resulting in a month under repair at Devonport. In July and August 1943, she was based in Plymouth, carrying out anti-submarine patrols in the Bay of Biscay.

Athabaskan was heavily damaged by a Henschel Hs 293 glider bomb, dropped by a KG 100 aircraft, during an anti-submarine chase off Cape Ortegal, in the Bay of Biscay, on 27 August 1943.  was sunk in the same incident. The glider bomb passed entirely through Athabaskan before detonating on the outside of the ship.

Returning to Scapa Flow in December 1943 she escorted convoy JW55A to the Soviet Union but in February 1944, rejoined Plymouth command and was assigned to the newly formed 10th Destroyer Flotilla carrying out ‘Operation Hostile’ (Minelaying) and ‘Operation Tunnel’ (Patrol) missions off the coast of France. On 26 April, she assisted in the destruction of the German   in the English Channel off Ushant as part of an ‘Operation Tunnel’ mission that included the British cruiser , destroyer  and Canadian Tribals ,  and Athabaskan. Three days later Athabaskan was sunk in another action.

Final action, sinking
On 29 April 1944 at about 0300 hours Athabaskan was patrolling with her sister Tribal-class destroyer Haida in support of a British minelaying operation off the coast of France near the mouth of the Morlaix River. She received the first of a series of Admiralty orders to intercept German warships near Ile de Bas (sometimes Île de Batz) as spotted by coastal radar in southern England. During the subsequent engagement with German naval vessels, Athabaskan was torpedoed and sank. 128 men were lost, 44 were rescued by Haida and 83 were taken prisoner by three German minesweepers sortied from the coast after the departure of Haida.

As might be expected with a night-time naval battle, various sources and even eyewitnesses provide widely differing accounts of the events surrounding the sinking of Athabaskan. Some survivors recount that the ship was initially struck by shore-battery gunfire, and then by a torpedo. At least one survivor tells of a second torpedo hit fifteen minutes after the first, but the official history of the Royal Canadian Navy attributes the second major explosion to the fires touching off the ammunition magazine.

Athabaskan was apparently torpedoed by the German torpedo boat . Athabaskans commanding officer, Lieutenant Commander John Stubbs, was killed in action after declining rescue by Haida to swim back for more crew members. In 2004, the Royal Canadian Navy provided a brass plaque to be laid on the wreck to commemorate the loss. The expedition found more information about the sinking but did not clarify the actual cause. The wreck is in a shattered condition spread over the sea bed.

HMCS Haida motor cutter rescue

When Haida quickly departed the area due to the onset of daylight and heightened risk from air and sea attacks, she left behind her motor cutter manned by Leading Seaman W. A. MacLure, Jack Hannam and three volunteers. MacLure and his comrades rescued six Athabaskan survivors along with two Haida crew who had been washed from the scramble nets as the ship departed. As recounted in Canada's official naval history, the German minesweepers chased the motor cutter but gave up for unknown reasons. After a series of breakdowns and encounters with enemy aircraft, MacLure's motor cutter eventually made landfall in England under Royal Air Force escort just before midnight on 29 April 1944.

Legacy
Athabaskan Island, near Bella Bella on the Central Coast of British Columbia, was named in memory of Athabaskan.

École John Stubbs Memorial School near Victoria, British Columbia is named for Lieutenant Commander John Stubbs.

Notes

References

Further reading

External links

HMCS Athabaskan G07
Royal Navy - Arctic Operations - HMCS Athabaskan

Tribal-class destroyers (1936) of the Royal Canadian Navy
World War II destroyers of Canada
World War II shipwrecks in the English Channel
1941 ships
Maritime incidents in April 1944
Ships built on the River Tyne
Ships built by Vickers Armstrong
Naval magazine explosions